Franz Xaver Hammer called Marteau (1741 – 11 October 1817) was a German gambist, cellist and composer.

Hammer was born in Oettingen in Bayern. From 1771 to 1778, he worked under Joseph Haydn as cellist of the Esterhazy's court ensemble in Eisenstadt and at the Eszterháza palace. It is thought that Haydn composed three cello concertos for him. His salary rose from already high—100 ducats and 30 kreuzers—a few times suggesting his extraordinary qualities as an instrumentalist. At the premiere of Haydn's oratorio Il Ritorno di Tobia, Hammer played his own cello concerto. During 1776–1813, he was member of the Viennese musicians' society.

From his works have survived sonatas for viola da gamba, viola d'amore and violoncello with basso continuo and also manuscript collections of instructive pieces and solo concertos for violoncello or viola da gamba and orchestra.

References
 German Wikipedia article

External links
 

German viol players
German classical cellists
German Classical-period composers
1741 births
1817 deaths
People from Oettingen in Bayern
German male classical composers
19th-century German male musicians